Andreas Koch (born 11 September 1966) is an Austrian former footballer.

References

1966 births
Living people
Association football goalkeepers
Austrian footballers
Austrian Football Bundesliga players
SK Rapid Wien players
First Vienna FC players
FC Tirol Innsbruck players
Grazer AK players